The West Coast Express  is a commuter railway serving the Lower Mainland region of British Columbia, Canada. Opened in 1995, it provides a link between Metro Vancouver and the Fraser Valley Regional District and is the only commuter railway in Western Canada.

Service is provided between Downtown Vancouver and the municipalities of Port Moody, Coquitlam, Port Coquitlam, Pitt Meadows, Maple Ridge, and Mission. Along its route, several stations interchange with the SkyTrain metropolitan rail system as well as local bus services. Additionally, Waterfront station in Downtown Vancouver provides a connection to the SeaBus passenger ferry.

Operation

The West Coast Express operates from Monday to Friday (excluding holidays) with five trains per day running from Mission to Vancouver in the morning peak hours and returning to Mission in the evening peak. A one-way trip takes 75 minutes, which is faster than driving to Downtown Vancouver.

The commuter railway is owned by TransLink, the transportation authority of the Metro Vancouver region, and a member of the Canadian Urban Transit Association. The Metro Vancouver Transit Police and Transit Security Officers conduct random fare inspections within the Fare Paid Zones at stations and on board trains. People caught without valid fare are removed from the train and may be fined $173. Contracted commissionaires provide station attendant services and a security presence, even checking fares on occasion at stations. Commissionaires do not conduct enforcement. Enforcement of fares and other regulations is conducted by the South Coast British Columbia Transportation Authority Police Service and Transit Security.

Supplementary bus service
Rail service is supplemented by TransLink's bus No. 701, which runs four eastbound and four westbound trips per weekday—one in the morning, one in the afternoon, and two in the evening—between Coquitlam Central station and Mission City station. As with the West Coast Express itself, this bus service does not run on weekends and holidays. TransLink's regular one-zone adult/concession fare rates apply to these trips. The eastbound bus makes regular stops until it reaches Haney Place Exchange in Maple Ridge and then runs non-stop for about 26 minutes to Mission City station. This process is reversed for westbound buses. The entire one-way route is completed in 60–70 minutes.

Prior services

Until 30 December 2016, the West Coast Express ran coach-style "TrainBus" service, which provided additional service when trains were not running. The TrainBus provided two buses, one from Port Haney station in Maple Ridge and one from Mission City station, to Vancouver in the morning (after all westbound trains had departed) and five buses eastbound (two mid-day, and three after all eastbound trains had departed Waterfront), three of which extended to Mission, stopping only at West Coast Express stations. This service was replaced by bus No. 701.

Map

Legend

Stations

Ridership

Fares
Use of the Compass Card on the West Coast Express began on 8 June 2015, along with new card vending machines. Existing paper fares were honoured until 24 July 2015.

West Coast Express fares can also be used as a three-zone fare on other TransLink services. A one-way fare expires 180 minutes from the time of purchase; all other fares work as an all-day pass. See TransLink Fares for more information on the pricing of the West Coast Express' fares.

, the lowest adult fare is $5.90 for one or two zones traveled excluding Waterfront station and $7.65 for three zones including Waterfront station. A discount is available for Compass Card users, who are also able to load return and monthly passes.

Rolling stock

 Denotes wheelchair access

Each train consists of a General Motors/ EMD F59PHI diesel-electric locomotive and between four and ten Bombardier BiLevel passenger coaches. The West Coast Express also operates an MPI MP36PH-3C for backup. The total fleet of passenger coaches numbers 44. Each passenger carriage has a seating capacity of 144 people. Like many commuter railways, the West Coast Express uses push–pull operation; instead of moving the locomotive to the other end of the train, it is controlled remotely from a second cab in the last passenger carriage, allowing the train to run 'backwards'; this occurs during mornings, as during afternoons the locomotive is at the front of train. Passenger amenities include washrooms, a cappuccino bar, power outlets, wheelchair accessibility and space for bicycles.

The coaches and locomotives are maintained by Via Rail and, under the contract, operated by Bombardier Transportation over tracks which belong to the Canadian Pacific Railway. Bombardier began a contract to operate the trains for the next five years, commencing on 5 May 2014. After May 2014, Track time is negotiated between TransLink and the CPR, which balances the use by the West Coast Express with its mainstay freight operation.

Future plans
TransLink's 2009 capital plan included upgrades to the Waterfront and Mission stations, and platform extensions to handle longer trains. In the 2009 10-Year Plan, TransLink also proposed a number of other improvements to West Coast Express service, some of the key improvements being:
Upgrades to Port Haney station passenger drop-off
Park and Ride expansion at Maple Meadows station

The company committed to maintaining the 2011 service levels to 2014. TransLink has been criticized for the low ridership of the West Coast Express and supports its expansion.

A 20-year service agreement between TransLink and the Canadian Pacific Railroad to operate the West Coast Express expired in 2015. Negotiations for renewal were initiated within the time period covered by this Base Plan. A fuller understanding of the future interaction of the service with the Evergreen Line is required, as well as an understanding of the overall market for long distance travel in the corridor. Accordingly, TransLink initiated the development of a West Coast Express Strategy in 2011 to consult with stakeholders and examine the issues. Completion of the strategy is expected in 2012, with subsequent implementation work expected to identify appropriate future service and infrastructure requirements.

A proposal in the 2009 10-Year Plan for a new station in Albion did not appear in the 2012 ten-year plan. Plans for a new station in northern Burnaby to service Simon Fraser University have been indefinitely postponed.

Notes

References

External links

 
West Coast Express official site
TransLink's official site
Rail pictures

 
Railway lines opened in 1995
Standard gauge railways in Canada
Passenger railways in British Columbia